The House of York was a cadet branch of the English royal House of Plantagenet. Three of its members became kings of England in the late 15th century. The House of York descended in the male line from Edmund of Langley, 1st Duke of York, the fourth surviving son of Edward III. In time, it also represented Edward III's senior line, when an heir of York married the heiress-descendant of Lionel, Duke of Clarence, Edward III's second surviving son. It is based on these descents that they claimed the English crown. Compared with its rival, the House of Lancaster, it had a superior claim to the throne of England according to cognatic primogeniture, but an inferior claim according to agnatic primogeniture. The reign of this dynasty ended with the death of Richard III of England at the Battle of Bosworth Field in 1485. It became extinct in the male line with the death of Edward Plantagenet, 17th Earl of Warwick, in 1499.

Descent from Edward III 

Edmund of Langley, 1st Duke of York, 1st Earl of Cambridge, KG (1341-1402) was the fourth of the five sons who survived to adulthood of King Edward III of England and Philippa of Hainault. He was the founder of the House of York, but it was through the marriage of his younger son, Richard of Conisburgh, 3rd Earl of Cambridge, to Anne Mortimer (descended from Lionel of Antwerp, 1st Duke of Clarence the second surviving son of King Edward III), that the Yorkist faction in the Wars of the Roses made its claim to the throne, claiming seniority over the ruling House of Lancaster, the opposing faction, descended from John of Gaunt, 1st Duke of Lancaster (the third surviving son of King Edward III), whose son Henry of Bolingbroke, later King Henry IV, had in 1399 usurped the throne of Richard II, the representative of the most senior line of the descendants of King Edward III.

Edmund had two sons, Edward of Norwich, 2nd Duke of York, and Richard of Conisburgh, 3rd Earl of Cambridge. Edward succeeded to the dukedom in 1402, but was killed at the Battle of Agincourt in 1415, with no issue. Richard of Conisburgh married Anne Mortimer, a great-granddaughter of Lionel of Antwerp, 1st Duke of Clarence, the second surviving son of Edward III, and the elder brother of John of Gaunt. Furthermore, Anne's son Richard of York, 3rd Duke of York also became heir general to the Earldom of March, after her only brother, Edmund Mortimer, 5th Earl of March, died without issue in 1425. Their father Roger Mortimer, 4th Earl of March had been named heir presumptive of King Richard II before the seizure of the throne by Henry IV, the first Lancastrian king. Although it had been passed over at the time, Anne's son Richard of York, 3rd Duke of York, also inherited this Mortimer claim to the throne, as well as the Mortimer estates.

Richard of Conisburgh had been executed following his involvement in the Southampton Plot to depose King Henry V (the son of Henry IV) in favour of his uncle Edmund Mortimer, 5th Earl of March. After the death in battle of Edward of Norwich, the Dukedom of York therefore passed to Richard of Conisburgh's eldest son, Richard Plantagenet, 3rd Duke of York, later King Edward IV, who whilst still Duke of York adopted a new coat of arms (in lieu of his paternal arms) which quartered the arms of Clarence, de Burgh and Mortimer, emphasising his claim to the throne from that senior lineage.

Wars of the Roses 

Despite his elevated status, Richard Plantagenet was denied a position in government by the advisers of the weak Henry VI, particularly John Beaufort, 1st Duke of Somerset, and the queen consort, Margaret of Anjou. Although he served as Protector of the Realm during Henry VI's period of incapacity in 1453–54, his reforms were reversed by Somerset's party once the king had recovered.

The Wars of the Roses began the following year, with the First Battle of St Albans. Initially, Richard aimed only to purge his Lancastrian political opponents from positions of influence over the king. It was not until October 1460 that he claimed the throne for the House of York. In that year the Yorkists had captured the king at the battle of Northampton, but victory was short-lived. Richard and his second son Edmund were killed at the battle of Wakefield on 30 December.

Richard's claim to the throne was inherited by his son Edward. With the support of Richard Neville, 16th Earl of Warwick ("The Kingmaker"), Edward, already showing great promise as a leader of men, defeated the Lancastrians in a succession of battles. While Henry VI and Margaret of Anjou were campaigning in the north, Warwick gained control of the capital and had Edward declared king in London in 1461. Edward strengthened his claim with a decisive victory at the Battle of Towton in the same year, in the course of which the Lancastrian army was virtually wiped out.

Reigns of the Yorkist Kings 

The early reign of Edward IV was marred by Lancastrian plotting and uprisings in favour of Henry VI. Warwick himself changed sides, and supported Margaret of Anjou and the king's jealous brother George, Duke of Clarence, in briefly restoring Henry in 1470–71. However, Edward regained his throne, and the House of Lancaster was wiped out with the death of Henry VI himself, in the Tower of London in 1471. In 1478, the continued trouble caused by Clarence led to his execution in the Tower of London; popularly he is thought to have been drowned in a butt of malmsey wine.

On Edward's death in 1483, the crown passed to his twelve-year-old son Edward. Edward IV's younger brother Richard, Duke of Gloucester, was appointed Protector, and the young king, and his brother Richard, were accommodated into the Tower of London. The famous Princes in the Tower's fate remains a mystery. As today it is unknown whether they were killed or who might have killed them. Parliament declared, in the document Titulus Regius, that the two boys were illegitimate, on the grounds that Edward IV's marriage was invalid, and as such Richard was heir to the throne. He was crowned Richard III in July 1483.

Defeat of the House of York 

Though the House of Lancaster's claimants were now the Royal Houses of Portugal and Castile through the Duke of Lancaster's two legitimate daughters, who had married into those houses, Henry Tudor, a descendant of the Beauforts, a legitimized branch of the House of Lancaster put forward his claim. Furthermore, some Edwardian loyalists were undeniably opposed to Richard, dividing his Yorkist power base. A coup attempt failed in late 1483, but in 1485 Richard met Henry Tudor at the battle of Bosworth Field. During the battle, some of Richard's important supporters switched sides or withheld their retainers from the field. Richard himself was killed. He was the last of the Plantagenet kings, as well as the last English king to die in battle.

Henry Tudor declared himself king, took Elizabeth of York, eldest child of Edward IV, as his wife, claiming to have united the surviving houses of York and Lancaster, and acceded to the throne as Henry VII, founder of the Tudor dynasty which reigned until 1603.

Later claimants

The de la Pole family were sometimes suggested as heirs to the Yorkist cause, but Henry Tudor and his son Henry VIII of England efficiently suppressed all such opposition.

Another Yorkist branch descends from George Plantagenet, 1st Duke of Clarence, and younger brother of Edward IV. The heir to this branch is the Earl of Loudoun, currently Simon Abney-Hastings. There was in Edward IV's reign a suspicion that this king was illegitimate. In 2004, the British TV station Channel 4 revived the George branch's claim as "Britain's Real Monarch". The Earls of Loudoun would then, at least, be the heirs to the Yorkists, but not to the British crown, as wrongly suggested by the programme, which is inherited in accordance with the 1701 Act of Settlement. Prior to 1701, the English (and later British) crowns were not automatically inherited by right.

Family tree 

 –  House of York
 – King of England
 – Duke/House of Lancaster

 – Duke of York
 – House of Tudor

Dukes of York 

| Edmund of Langley(House of York founder)1385–1402 ||  || 5 June 1341Kings Langleyson of Edward III of England and Philippa of Hainault|| Isabella of Castile13723 childrenJoan de Hollandca. 4 November 1393no children ||1 August 1402Kings Langleyage 61

|-
| Edward of Norwich1402–1415 ||  || 1373Norwichson of Edmund of Langley and Isabella of Castile||Philippa de Mohunc. 1397no children||25 October 1415Agincourtage 42

|-
| Richard Plantagenet1415–1460 ||  || 21 September 1411son of Richard of Conisburgh, 3rd Earl of Cambridge and Anne de Mortimer||Cecily Neville143712 children||30 December 1460Wakefieldage 49

|-
| Edward Plantagenet1460–1461 ||  || 28 April 1442Rouenson of Richard Plantagenet and Cecily Neville||Elizabeth Woodville1 May 146410 children||9 April 1483Westminsterage 40

|-
|}
Edward Plantagenet became Edward IV in 1461, thus merging the title of Duke of York with the crown.

Yorkist Kings of England 

| Edward IV4 March 1461 –3 October 147011 April1471–1483 ||  || 28 April 1442Rouenson of Richard Plantagenet, 3rd Duke of York and Cecily Neville || Elizabeth WoodvilleGrafton Regis1 May 146410 children || 9 April 1483Westminster Palaceage 40

|-
| Edward V9 April–25 June 1483 ||  || 2 November 1470Westminsterson of Edward IV and Elizabeth Woodville || unmarried || c. 1483Londonage about 12 (presumed murdered)

|-
| Richard III26 June1483–1485 ||  || 2 October 1452Fotheringhay Castleson of Richard Plantagenet, 3rd Duke of York and Cecily Neville || Anne NevilleWestminster Abbey12 July 14721 son || 22 August 1485Bosworth Fieldage 32 (killed in battle)
|}

York badges

The most popular symbol of the house of York was the White Rose of York. The Yorkist rose is white in colour, because in Christian liturgical symbolism, white is the symbol of light, typifying innocence and purity, joy and glory. During the civil wars of the fifteenth century, the White Rose was the symbol of Yorkist forces opposed to the rival House of Lancaster. The red rose of Lancaster would be a later invention used to represent the House of Lancaster, but was not in use during the actual conflict. The opposition of the two roses gave the wars their name: the Wars of the Roses (coined in the 19th century).

See also 
 Quia Emptores
 Yorkshire
 Culture of Yorkshire
 Pretenders
 Alternative successions to the English and British Crown

Notes

References

External links 

 The White Rose of York on the 'History of York' website.
 The Plantagenets on the official website of the British monarchy.
 The Yorkists on the official website of the British monarchy.

 
Royal houses of England
York, House of
1385 establishments in England
1499 disestablishments in England